Soraya is a feminine Persian name. It is derived from the Arabic name for the Pleiades star cluster, Thurayya. The name is also popular in Europe due to its association with Soraya Esfandiary-Bakhtiari, the second wife of Shah Mohammad Reza Pahlavi of Iran, who became a European socialite.

For phonological reasons, it is usually transcribed as Suraya in Afghanistan and Surayo in Tajikistan.

People
Soraya (1969–2006), Colombian-American singer/songwriter
Soraya Alekozei (born 1955), Afghan-German interpreter and veteran
Soraya Arnelas (born 1982), Spanish singer
Soraya Ray L. Bañas (Kitkat) (born 1989), Filipina singer, comedienne and actress
Soraya Brigui (born 2005), singer and 2018 finalist of The Voice Kids (Belgium).
Soraya Córdova (born 1959), Mexican politician
Soraya Esfandiary-Bakhtiary (1932–2001), second wife of Mohammad Reza Pahlavi of Iran, known during her marriage as Queen Soraya
Soraya Jiménez (1977–2013), Mexican weightlifter, first female athlete from Mexico to win an Olympic gold medal
Soraya Manutchehri, subject of the 2008 film The Stoning of Soraya M.
Soraya Martínez Ferrada (born 1972), Chilean-born Canadian politician
Soraya Moraes (born 1973), Brazilian singer, four-time Latin Grammy Award winner
Soraya Peke-Mason (born 1957/1958), New Zealand politician
Soraya Post (born 1956), Swedish politician
Soraya Sáenz de Santamaría (born 1971), Spanish politician
Soraya Saga (born 1969), Japanese illustrator and video-game story-writer
Soraya Sarhaddi Nelson, American journalist for National Public Radio
Soraya Serajeddini (1960–2006), Kurdish-Iranian human rights activist
Soraya Tarzi (1899–1968), wife of King Amanullah Khan of Afghanistan, known during her marriage as Queen Soraya
Soraya Telles (born 1958), Brazilian former middle-distance runner
Suraiya (1929–2004), Indian actress and singer
Suraiya Hasan Bose (1928–2021), Indian textile conservator

Other
Sorayya (newspaper), Persian weekly newspaper published between 1898 and 1900 in Cairo
Soraya, a small lunar crater within Alphonsus
Sooraya Qadir (Dust), a Marvel comic book character from the X-Men series
Soraya, a song on the album Animals as Leaders by the band of the same name
a sunflower variety
Soraya Montenegro, a character in María la del Barrio portrayed by Itatí Cantoral
Suraiya Nagar, village in Madhya Pradesh, India

See also
Saraya (disambiguation)
Sabina (disambiguation)
Sabrina (disambiguation)
Sarah (disambiguation)
Sarai (disambiguation) / or Serai / Saraj
Sarina (disambiguation)
Sarita (disambiguation)
Sariya (disambiguation)
Seraiah, a Hebrew name
Seraya (disambiguation)
Surya (disambiguation)

References

Pakistani feminine given names
Persian feminine given names
Spanish feminine given names